Ever since 2003, the Social Democrats had held the mayor's position in Bornholm Regional Municipality.

Following the 2017 election, Winnie Grosbøll from the Social Democrats
had won the mayor's position.

In 2020, she accepted a new job as CEO of Friluftsrådet, and announced that she would step down as mayor from 2021. This would result in Thomas Thors making a comeback as mayor, a position he held from 2003 to 2005.

In September 2021, an opinion poll suggested that the Red–Green Alliance could challenge the Social Democrats in becoming the largest party. Later in October, they would even lead an opinion poll. It was speculated that the Red–Green Alliance had managed to win sympathy, after arguing that the money for the Social Democrats's project of a new town hall, could be spend better on funds for vulnerable young people, and club offers for kids around the 7–9 years.

In the elecion result, the Social Democrats would lose 4 seats, and see their worst election result in the municipality. The Red–Green Alliance would manage to receive the most votes and seats. However it would be from Jacob Trøst from the Conservatives who would become the new mayor. This was following an agreement between the Conservatives, the Christian Democrats, Danish People's Party and the Red–Green Alliance.

In total, the Social Democrats and Venstre won 6 seats, a decrease of 7. They were the parties who had made the plans to build a new town hall, and this might have played a big factor.

Electoral system
For elections to Danish municipalities, a number varying from 9 to 31 are chosen to be elected to the municipal council. The seats are then allocated using the D'Hondt method and a closed list proportional representation.
Bornholm Municipality had 23 seats in 2021

Unlike in Danish General Elections, in elections to municipal councils, electoral alliances are allowed.

Electoral alliances  

Electoral Alliance 1

Electoral Alliance 2

Electoral Alliance 3

Electoral Alliance 4

Results

Notes

References 

Bornholm
Politics of Denmark